William Henry Booker FRHistS (23 January 1826 – 10 March 1896) was an English architect based in Nottingham.

He was born in Sneinton, Nottingham on 23 January 1826, the son of William Booker (architect and surveyor) and Eliza (d. 1884). He entered into partnership with his two younger brothers, Frederick Richard Booker (1827–1882) and Robert Booker and they worked from office on Short Hill, Nottingham as W & F. R Booker, and later W & F & R Booker.

He married Sarah (d. 17 May 1878).

In 1876 he was elected a Fellow of the Royal Historical Society in London.

He died on 10 March 1896 at Nottingham.

Notable works

References

1826 births
1896 deaths
Architects from Nottingham
Fellows of the Royal Historical Society